Anolis barahonae, the Baoruco giant anole or Barahona anole, is a species of lizard in the family Dactyloidae. The species is found in Hispaniola.

References

Anoles
Reptiles of Haiti
Reptiles of the Dominican Republic
Reptiles described in 1962
Taxa named by Ernest Edward Williams